Dana Bolles is an American spaceflight engineer and advocate for those with disabilities in STEM. She has worked at NASA since 1995 in a variety of fields. She is also an ambassador for the American Association for the Advancement of Science's If/then initiative.

Early life and education 
Bolles was born without arms or legs. She has stated that she became interested in visiting space at an early age since it would allow her to move without the assistance of her wheelchair. Bolles earned a bachelor's degree in mechanical engineering from California State University, Long Beach in 1993, and has a master's degree in rehabilitation engineering and technology from San Francisco State University.

Career 
Bolles started working at NASA in 1995 as an engineer in regulatory compliance, including work on environmental regulations. This later expanded to work in protecting humans in outer space and scientific communications.

She also volunteers as an advocate for women, people with disabilities, and members of the LGBT community. Her advocacy has a particular focus on the challenges that people with disabilities encounter in their lives, and has spoken about the stereotypes they often face, mentioning that people tend to respond the most to disability compared to other intersectionalities.

In 2021 Bolles joined a group of people with physical disabilities in a zero gravity parabolic flight.

Bolles was one of the women depicted in the Smithsonian Institution's 2022 exhibit spotlighting women in STEM.

Awards and recognition 
 NASA Equal Employment Opportunity Medal (2014)

References

External links 
Interview, Gravity Assist: Breaking Barriers, with Dana Bolles

American Association for the Advancement of Science
American disability rights activists
Living people
Year of birth missing (living people)
California State University, Long Beach alumni
San Francisco State University alumni
Mechanical engineers
Scientists with disabilities
Wheelchair users
NASA people